Machap Jaya is a state constituency in Malacca, Malaysia, that has been represented in the Melaka State Legislative Assembly.

The state constituency was first contested in 2018 and is mandated to return a single Assemblyman to the Melaka State Legislative Assembly under the first-past-the-post voting system. , the State Assemblyman for Machap Jaya is Ngwe Hee Sem from the Malaysian Chinese Association (MCA), which is part of the state's ruling coalition, Barisan Nasional (BN).

The state constituency was first contested under the name of Machap but was renamed to Machap Jaya for the 2018 election.

Definition 
The Machap Jaya constituency contains the polling districts of Tebong, FELDA Hutan Percha, Kemuning, Solok Menggong, Machap Baru, Ayer Pasir, Machap Umbor and Melaka Pindah.

Demographics

History

Polling districts
According to the gazette issued on 31 October 2022, the Machap Jaya constituency has a total of 8 polling districts.

Representation history

Election results
The electoral results for the Machap Jaya state constituency in 2008, 2013 and 2018 are as follows.

References 

Malacca state constituencies